Zhang Qibin (born November 1953) is a former major general in the People's Liberation Army of China. In August 2014 he was placed under investigation by the PLA's anti-corruption agency. Previously he served as Deputy Chief of Staff of the Jinan Military Region, one of seven military districts located in the east of China.

Life and career
Zhang was born and raised in Shen County (currently Shenzhou city), Hebei. In December 2001 he was promoted to become commander of the 26th Army, a position he held until July 2003. Then he was promoted again to become Deputy Chief of Staff of the North Sea Fleet. In May 2010, he appointed the Deputy Chief of Staff of the Jinan Military Region. In August 2014, he was placed under investigation by the PLA's anti-corruption agency. In November 2014, he was transferred to judicial organs.

References

1953 births
Living people
People's Liberation Army generals from Hebei
People from Shenzhou City